RAF Wilmslow was a Royal Air Force station that existed from 1938 until 1962 in Wilmslow, Cheshire. It was known as No. 4 School of Recruit Training.

History
The station was used for training new recruits. The recruits would learn about living RAF procedures and other information for a period of weeks then would be transferred to their operational station.

Current use
The station was demolished shortly after closing in 1962. During the 1980s the eastern part of the camp was developed with housing by local construction company Jones Homes, forming the 'Summerfields' development. During the early 1990s the A34 bypass of Wilmslow was constructed, which cut the site in two. Between 1996 and 2015 the remaining western part of the site was developed for housing, forming 'The Villas' and 'Regents Park' developments.

References

Citations

Bibliography
 The Squadrons of the Royal Air Force 1918-1988, J.J. Halley, Air-Britain, Tonbridge, 1988,

External links
 RAF Wilmslow
 Air of Authority - An Organisational History of the RAF

Defunct hospitals in England
Hospitals in Cheshire
Military hospitals in the United Kingdom
Royal Air Force Medical Services
Royal Air Force stations in Cheshire
RAF